is the 33rd single by Japanese singer/songwriter Chisato Moritaka. Written by Moritaka and Harry Hosono, the single was released by One Up Music on October 15, 1997.

Background 
"Miracle Light" fulfilled a life-long dream of Moritaka to collaborate with veteran musician Hosono. In addition to recording the single, they both starred in a series of Lawson commercials.

Music video 
The music video features footage from Moritaka's 1997 Sega Saturn game Watarasebashi/La La Sunshine, with a collage of photos, animation, and a stage performance by Moritaka dressed in a witch costume.

Chart performance 
"Miracle Light" peaked at No. 20 on Oricon's singles chart and sold 30,000 copies.

Other versions 
Moritaka re-recorded the song and uploaded the video on her YouTube channel on July 20, 2013. This version is also included in Moritaka's 2014 self-covers DVD album Love Vol. 5.

Track listing 
All lyrics are written by Chisato Moritaka; all music is composed and arranged by Harry Hosono.

Personnel 
 Chisato Moritaka – vocals, drums
 Harry Hosono – keyboards, guitar, bass

Chart positions

References

External links 
 
 
 

1997 singles
1997 songs
Japanese-language songs
Chisato Moritaka songs
Songs with lyrics by Chisato Moritaka
One Up Music singles